Silent Dust is a 1949 British drama/thriller film directed by Lance Comfort and starring Sally Gray, Stephen Murray, Derek Farr and Nigel Patrick. The title comes from lines in Thomas Gray's Elegy Written in a Country Churchyard Can Honour's voice provoke the silent dust, or flattery soothe the dull cold ear of Death?  The screenplay was by Michael Pertwee, adapted from his own play The Paragon.  The film was shot in film noir style with dramatic use of light and shadow.

Plot
Simon Rawley is reported killed in the last days of World War II, and his blind father Robert (Murray) decides to build a cricket pavilion in his memory in the local village. His neighbour Lord Clandon (Seymour Hicks) urges him to extend the dedication to all the local men who gave their lives in the war, but Robert refuses. Planning and construction take some time and three years pass, during which Simon's widow Angela (Gray) falls in love with local doctor's son Maxwell Oliver (Derek Farr) whilst they have both been posted to Occupied Germany after the war. Robert cannot help feeling that this is disloyal to his dead son, but his second wife Joan (Campbell) does her best to convince him that Angela is entitled to search for happiness again. The pavilion is finally completed and plans are in place for the grand dedication and opening. The local police are meanwhile looking for a villain who coshed a motorist and stole his car in London, and has dumped the car in the vicinity.

Robert surprises an intruder in the house that evening. He is closely followed by Angela, who to her great shock recognises her "dead" husband Simon (Patrick). He signals to her not to let Robert know his identity. Later he comes up with elaborate excuses to Angela to explain his resurrection and lack of contact since the war, but she soon sees through the lies. It is subsequently revealed that, far from dying a hero's death on the battlefield, Simon was a deserter who faked his own death.  Since the war he has been making a living on the wrong side of the law as a black-marketeering spiv. Now down on his luck, he has returned (in the stolen car) to try to extort money.

Angela has to let Joan in on Simon's return from the dead, and the two try desperately to shield Robert from the knowledge of his son's return in such circumstances, aware that the shattering of his illusions would destroy him. The unscrupulous Simon, learning of Angela's new attachment to Maxwell, demands £5,000 to leave for good. Robert gradually comes to realise that something very strange is going on, and little by little manages to piece together that Simon is in hiding somewhere in the house. He finally manages to track him down and a struggle ensues, climaxing with Simon falling to his death from a balcony. With his son's perfidy finally revealed to all, Robert agrees to change the dedication of the pavilion, as Lord Clandon had requested all along.

Cast

Reception
A contemporary review in the Australian newspaper The Age credited it as "first-class screen fare...strong drama...(which) combines a good and arresting story with first class acting". The New York Times found the film to have "considerable merit as drama" and singled out Murray's "acutely sharp characterisation" for praise, but felt that overall it was somewhat let down by "(showing) its stage heritage in a number of static sequences which rob it of much-needed vitality".

Trade papers called the film a "notable box office attraction" in British cinemas in 1949.

References

External links 
 
 
 

1949 films
1949 drama films
Films directed by Lance Comfort
British black-and-white films
British films based on plays
British thriller drama films
Films scored by Georges Auric
1940s thriller drama films
1940s British films